Nerea Martí (born 2 January 2002 in Albalat dels Sorells) is a Spanish female racing driver. She currently competes in F1 Academy.

Career

Karting
Martí began karting aged nine through her father's rental kart track. Late in her karting career, she was contracted to Fórmula de Campeones in an attempt to step up into professional racing.

Lower formulae
Martí made her single-seater debut in Spanish Formula 4 in 2019, scoring a podium in her first event. A pair of seventh places late in the season would see her finish 16th in the standings and 2nd in the female trophy behind Belén García.

W Series

In 2020, Martí qualified for the second edition of the W Series, a Formula 3 championship exclusively for women. The season was eventually cancelled as a result of the COVID-19 pandemic, after which she opted to race in the Spanish Karting Championship, where she finished 8th in the KZ category.

2021 
Martí would eventually make her W Series debut in 2021. She achieved her first and only podium of the season at the Hungaroring, but finished 4th in the standings—as the best rookie—having scored points in all eight rounds.

2022 
Martí qualified on pole position for the first race of the 2022 season, at the Miami International Autodrome. It was her first W Series pole position.

FIA Formula 3
Martí was selected to take part in a one-day FIA Formula 3 test at Magny-Cours in November 2021, alongside fellow W Series driver Irina Sidorkova and Iron Dames racers Maya Weug and Doriane Pin.

Racing record

Career summary

Complete W Series results 
(key) (Races in bold indicate pole position) (Races in italics indicate fastest lap)

Complete Formula Winter Series results 
(key) (Races in bold indicate pole position; races in italics indicate fastest lap)

References

External links
 
 
 

Spanish racing drivers
Spanish female racing drivers
2002 births
Living people
Spanish F4 Championship drivers
W Series drivers
F1 Academy drivers
People from Horta Nord
Sportspeople from the Province of Valencia
Campos Racing drivers